Jaswant Singh Neki (27 August 1925 – 11 September 2018) was a leading Indian Sikh scholar, significant neo-metaphysical Punjabi language poet and former Director of PGI Chandigarh and Head of the Psychiatry Department at All India Institute of Medical Sciences (AIIMS), Delhi.

As a poet he is known mostly for his poetry collections, Asle to Ohle Tak (Illusion and Reality, 1955) and autobiographical, Koi Naon Na Jane Mera (2000). He was awarded the Sahitya Akademi Award in Punjabi in 1979 for his work, Karuna Di Chuh Ton Magron. His long autobiographical poem Simriti De Kiran Ton Pehlan (Before Shedding Memory) published in 1975, is considered among the masterpieces of Indian literature. His works as a scholar of Sikhism include, Ardaas: Darshan Roop Te Abhiyas, Sada Vigas, Achetan di Leela, Divine Intimations, Prophet of Devotion and Pilgrimage to Hemkunt.

Early life and education

He was born in the village of Murid, District of Jhelum (in present-day Pakistan). His father was S. Hari Gulab Singh and his mother was Smt. Sita Wanti. When he was still an infant, his parents moved to Quetta in (Baluchistan) in present-day Pakistan.

Education

It was in Quetta that he joined Khalsa High School whence he matriculated in 1941 securing the highest marks in Baluchistan and setting up a new record. He joined the Forman Christian College, Lahore, for his premedical studies.

There he enjoyed two merit scholarships – one granted by the University and the other by the college. In his FSc (Medical) exam, he stood second in the university. For his graduate course in medicine and surgery, he joined King Edward Medical College, Lahore, where he also received a merit scholarship granted by the Government of Baluchistan.

In 1947 when the country was partitioned, he left Lahore and joined Government Medical College, Amritsar, where he completed his medical studies to graduate in 1949. He worked first as a House Physician, then as an Assistant Registrar, and then as a Demonstrator in Medical College, Amritsar, with a short stint, in between, as Demonstrator in Christian Medical College Ludhiana. While teaching there, he passed his M.A. (Psychology) exam as a teacher candidate from Aligarh Muslim University, securing First Division and first position in the University. He passed his DPM exam from All India Institute of Mental Health, Bangalore, and Mysore University, in 1958 with double distinction and setting up a new record. Thus he qualified as a psychiatrist.

Professional career

As a psychiatrist, rising through the ranks, he became Professor & Head of Psychiatry Department at the All India Institute of Medical Sciences, New Delhi and occupied that chair for about a decade (1968–1978). He was then appointed Director of the Post Graduate Institute of Medical Education and Research, Chandigarh (PGI) where he spent three years (1978–1981). From there, he was picked up by the World Health Organization, Geneva, as a consultant for a project in Africa where he served for over four years (1981–1985). He came back home in 1985, and then engaged in private practice. In between, he had a short engagement with the United Nations Development Programme and United Nations Fund for Drug Abuse (South-East Asia).

He also served as Chairman of the Board of Consultants constituted by the Delhi Sikh Gurdwara Management Committee for setting up of an Institute of Medical Sciences. In 1974, he was elected as a Fellow of the National Academy of Medical Sciences and in 1989, he received Kohli Memorial Award for being the Best Professional of the Year.

Literary activities

He is a well-recognized metaphysical poet in Punjabi who has contributed ten volumes of original verse. His opus magnum is his autobiography in verse. He also wrote powerful, inspiring prose as evidenced by his books Achetan di Leela, Meri Sahitak Swaijeevani and Ardas. He has won several prestigious awards in literature. These include: Sahitya Akademi Award, Asan Memorial Award, Shiromani Sahitkar Award (Languages Deptt.), Sarvotam Sahitkar Award (Punjabi Akademy, Delhi) in 2009 for Sada Vigaas (prose)., Bhai Vir Singh Award, KS Dhaliwal Award, Puran Singh Memorial Award. Guru Nanak Dev University conferred on him Ph.D. honorous causa for his contribution to literature. He has been a member of the jury (Punjabi) for Sahitya Akademy Awards and member of the Advisory Committee (Punjabi) for Jnan Peeth Award. He was one of the past Chairmen of Punjabi Academy, Chandigarh.

He also served as Honorary General Secretary of Bhai Vir Singh Sahitya Sadan, New Delhi.

Religious activities

Belonging to a devout religious family, Dr Neki always evinced keen interest in religion. Like his family, he also observed unbigoted, liberal views. During his student life, he became President of the All India Sikh Students Federation and organised training camps for the Sikh youth in the Sikh lore. He produced two authentic books. One is Ardas – Darshan, Roop te Abhias which has been evaluated as an 'all-time classic'. The second one, Vishva Ardas, is a collection of over 300 prayers from different religious groups, tribes and communities of different times and places, translated into Punjabi verse. This has been called "a landmark piece of work". Commissioned by Guru Nanak Dev University, he wrote The Spiritual Heritage of the Punjab which traces the evolution of spiritual thought and practice from the pre-Aryan times up to Guru Gobind Singh. Lately, he has produced an exquisitely produced book Pilgrimage to Hemkunt that compares with high international standards.

For several years, he was a member of the Dharam Prachar Committee of Shiromani Gurdwara Prabandhak Committee, the elected body that administers Sikh shrines. He was honoured with the 'Order of the Khalsa' Award on the 300th Anniversary of the Khalsa, celebrated in Anandpur Sahib on 13 April 2000. He represented his community at various international forums including The Parliament World Religions 1993, Unesco Conference on Religion and World Peace 1998, Unesco Center Catalunya Conference on Universal Ethics 1998, World Thanksgiving Conference 1999

In 2001, he received the Giani Lal Singh memorial award for his work in the field of poetry.

Personal life

In 1955, he married Kanwerjit, the eldest daughter of his own Professor, Lt. Col. Dr. Gurbuxsh Singh. He had two children, both of whom live in the United States. Neki died on September 11, 2015 In New Delhi.

Publications

References

Vedamsbooks: Pilgrimage to Hemkunt/text by Jaswant Singh Neki. Photographs by Sondeep Shankar. Reprint. New Delhi, UBSPD, 2002, 96 p., (pbk). 
The Tribune,  Chandigarh, India: Jaswant Singh Neki honoured

External links
 Dr. Jaswant Singh Neki, website
 A Remarkable Life: Dr. Jaswant Singh Neki

Punjabi-language poets
1925 births
2015 deaths
Poets from Punjab, India
People from Jhelum
Forman Christian College alumni
University of Mysore alumni
Indian psychiatrists
Punjabi-language writers
Punjabi people
Indian Sikhs
Scholars of Sikhism
Recipients of the Sahitya Akademi Award in Punjabi
20th-century Indian scholars
King Edward Medical University alumni
Fellows of the National Academy of Medical Sciences
Indian spiritual writers
20th-century Indian medical doctors
20th-century Indian poets
Indian social sciences writers
Scholars from Punjab, India
Medical doctors from Punjab, India